Franco Basaglia (11 March 1924 29 August 1980) was an Italian psychiatrist, neurologist, professor who proposed the dismantling of psychiatric hospitals, pioneer of the modern concept of mental health,  Italian psychiatry reformer, figurehead and founder of Democratic Psychiatry
architect, and principal proponent of Law 180 which abolished mental hospitals in Italy. He is considered to be the most influential Italian psychiatrist of the 20th century.

Biography 
Franco Basaglia was born on 11 March 1924 in Venice. After obtaining his medical degree from University of Padova in 1949, he trained in the local school of psychiatry, where he acquainted himself with the philosophical ideas of Karl Jaspers, Ludwig Binswanger and Eugène Minkowski, developed an interest in the study of phenomenological philosophers such as Edmund Husserl, Martin Heidegger, Maurice Merleau-Ponty, and Jean-Paul Sartre, and analyzed the work of sociological and historical critics of psychiatric institutions such as Erving Goffman and Michel Foucault.

He died in Venice.

Views 
According to Renato Piccione, the intellectual legacy of Franco Basaglia can be divided into three periods:
 university period which initiated the process of criticizing psychiatry as "science" that ought to cure and liberate a person but in fact oppresses them;
 institutional negation which coincides with experience in Gorizia (1962–1968);
 deinstitutionalization which coincides with direction of experience in Trieste (1971–1979).

When Basaglia arrived at Gorizia, he was revolted by what he observed as the conventional regime of institutional 'care': locked doors only partly successful in muffling the weeping and screams of the patients, many of them lying nude and powerless in their excrement. And Basaglia observed the institutional response to human suffering: physical abuse, straitjackets, ice packs, bed ties, ECT and insulin-coma shock therapies to 'quiet' the melancholy and the terrified, and to strike terror in the agitated and the difficult.

In 1961, Franco Basaglia started refusing to bind patients to their beds in the Lunatic Asylum of Gorizia. He also abolished any isolation method. From this initiative started a wide theoretical and practical debate all over Italy. Such a huge debate resulted in the endorsement in 1978 of a national reform bill in 1978 that provided the gradual but radical closure and dismantling of the mental hospitals in the whole country.

Basaglia insisted that much in the inveterate stereotypes of madness was actually the consequence of institutional conditions, but not a real danger which the walls of a mental hospital had been required to contain. He considered psychiatric hospital as an oppressive, locked and total institution in which prison-like, punitive rules are applied, in order to gradually eliminate its own contents; and patients, doctors and nurses are all subjected (at different levels) to the same process of institutionalism.

Basaglia recognized that many of the characteristics of his patients which were believed to be inherent in their mental illness, such as the vacant stares and the repetitive gestures and movements, appeared to dissolve as the patients left the confines of the asylum. Basaglia concluded from this that society would not know what mental illnesses were, or what limitations they would inherently put on persons with them, until both staff and patients were freed from the beliefs, attitudes and culture of the asylum. Basaglia was concerned that, without the complete closing of asylums, mental health professionals would unknowingly reconstitute the asylum culture in community facilities. As long as confinement remained possible, professionals would continue to regard themselves as the ultimately responsible parties, and patients would continue to regard their agency and freedom as dependent on the doctor's will.

Basaglia considered mental illness as the consequence of the exclusion processes acting in social institutions. He stated: "The mental illness is not reason and origin but the necessary and natural consequence of the power dynamics–related exclusion processes potentially and concretely acting in all social institutions. It is not sufficient to liberate the ill to restore life, history to the persons who were deprived of their life, their history."

Basaglia and his followers believed that psychiatry was used as the provider to the establishment of scientific support for social control. The ensuing standards of deviance and normality brought about repressive views of discrete social groups. This approach was nonmedical and pointed out the role of mental hospitals in the control and medicalization of deviant behaviors and social problems.

Works 
The first substantial report by Franco Basaglia was titled The destruction of the Mental Hospital as a place of institutionalisation and presented by him on the First International Congress of Social Psychiatry held in London in 1964. In this report Basaglia stated that "the psychiatrist of today seems to have discovered, suddenly, that the first step towards the cure of the patient is his return to liberty of which, until now, the psychiatrist himself had deprived him" and that "it is true that the discovery of liberty is the most obvious that Psychiatry could reach." In conclusion, Basaglia tried to fix some points in an attempt to form a lever for discovering liberty: 
 Pressure on the administration on which the hospital depends, by the involved action of joint responsibility for the situation previously maintained.
 The awakening of conscience and of joint responsibility on the part of the doctors who have accepted and preserved this situation.
 The introduction of drugs by means of which, notwithstanding the institutionalised climate, the breaking of the "bond" of the patients was made possible.
 The attempt at re-education—theoretical and humane—of the nurses. (This, however, is still far from having been reached.)
 The keeping alive—as far as possible—of the ties of the patient with the world outside (family, friends, interests).
 The opening of the doors, and the beginning of life according to the open door system.
 The creation of presuppositions of the Day Hospital, soon to be opened, as a part-time service.

In 1968, L'istituzione negata ('The Institution Denied'), edited by Franco Basaglia, was published. Widely read all over Italy, this book not only documented and analyzed the changes at Gorizia but also carried anti-institutional debate into other areas: factories, universities and schools.

Legacy 
While discussing the process of transformation of mental health care across the European Region, Matt Muijen argues that the influence of professionals has obviously been decisive, mostly psychiatrists who acted as advocates of change, such as Philippe Pinel in France in the 19th century and Franco Basaglia in Italy in the 20th. They offered conceptions of new models of effective and humane care, revolutionary for their times, replacing abusive and inadequate traditional services. Their real accomplishment was the ability to inspire politicians to advocate these conceptions and persuade colleagues to implement them, thereby enabling sustainable and real change.

Giovanna Russo and Francesco Carelli state that back in 1978 the Basaglia reform perhaps could not be fully implemented because society was unprepared for such an avant-garde and innovative concept of mental health. Thirty years later, it has become more obvious that this reform reflects a concept of modern health and social care for mental patients. The Italian example originated samples of effective and innovative service models and paved the way for deinstitutionalisation of mental patients.

Giovanni de Girolamo with coauthors argues that Basaglia's contribution was crucial to move psychiatric practice into the realm of health care and give visibility to psychiatry.

P. Fusar-Poli with coauthors argues that thanks to the Basaglia law, psychiatry in Italy began to be integrated into the general health services and was no longer sidelined to a peripheral area of medicine.

In the 2001 National Mental Health Conference, Italian neurologist and laureate of the 1986 Nobel Prize in Physiology or Medicine Rita Levi-Montalcini expressed her admiration for Franco Basaglia by calling him the founder of the new conception of mental illness, a magnificent scientist and fine human being who really lived the tragic problem of mental illness.

British clinical psychologist Richard Bentall argues that after Franco Basaglia had persuaded the Italian government to pass Law 180, which made new hospitalizations to large mental hospitals illegal, the results were controversial. In the following decade many Italian doctors complained that the prisons had become depositories for the seriously mentally ill, and that they found themselves "in a state psychiatric-therapeutic impotence when faced with the uncontrollable paranoid schizophrenic, the agitated-meddlesome maniac, or the catatonic". These complaints were seized upon psychiatrists elsewhere, eager to exhibit the foolishness of abandoning conventional ways. However, an efficient network of smaller community mental health clinics gradually developed to replace the old system.

The president of the World Phenomenology Institute Anna-Teresa Tymieniecka states that Basaglia managed to pull together substantial revolutionary and reformatory energies around his anti-institutional project and created the conditions which within a few years brought to the reform of mental health legislation in 1978. This reform was introduced amongst great enthusiasm and bitter criticism, hostility and perplexity, critical and sometimes unconditional support. Basaglia thereby managed to inflict a salutary shock on Italian psychiatry, which had previously been torpid.

American psychiatrist Loren Mosher called Basaglia the most innovative and influential European psychiatrist since Freud.

Francine Saillant and Serge Genest assert that Basaglia's reform of psychiatry in Italy, renewed vision on Italian society, and radical critique of public institutions made him one of Italy's greatest, most progressive intellectuals and a leading figure of the second half of the 20th century.

Thomas Szasz had a radically critical opinion about the work of Basaglia. In 1986, in the preface to the book by Giorgio Antonucci 'I pregiudizi e la conoscenza critica alla psichiatria', Szasz writes the following words about the misunderstanding of the ideas of Basaglia:

See also
 Basaglia Law
 Giorgio Coda
 Giorgio Antonucci
 Democratic Psychiatry
 Psychiatric reform in Italy
 Deinstitutionalisation
 Anti-psychiatry

References

Selected bibliography

Research papers

Books and reports 
 Che cos'è la psichiatria?, 1967, Einaudi (some passages)
 L'istituzione negata, Turin, 1968, Einaudi
 Morire di classe, Turin, 1969, Einaudi (book of photographs by Carla Cerati and Gianni Berengo Gardin).
 Il malato artificiale, Turin, 1969, Einaudi
 La maggioranza deviante (with Franca Ongaro), Turin, 1971, Einaudi
 
 Crimini di pace, (with Foucault, Goffman, Laing, Chomsky).
 Conferenze brasiliane, Raffaello Cortina
 Corso di aggiornamento per operatori psichiatrici, 1979
 La chiusura dell'ospedale psichiatrico, 1976
 Le contraddizioni della comunità terapeutica, 1970 
 La distruzione dell'ospedale psichiatrico come luogo di istituzionalizzazione, 1964
 Scritti, vol. 1: 1953-1968: Dalla psichiatria fenomenologica all'esperienza di Gorizia, Einaudi, Turin, 1981
 Scritti vol. 2: 1968-1980. Dall'apertura del manicomio alla nuova legge sull'Assistenza psichiatrica, Einaudi, Torino
 La violenza (scritto con Franco Fornari), Vallecchi, Flowrence, 1978
 L'utopia della realtà Turin, Einaudi.

Further reading
 

 Francesco Codato. Follia, potere e istituzione: genesi del pensiero di Franco Basaglia, UNI Service, Trento, 2010 
 Jürgen Härle. Die demokratische Psychiatrie in Italien. Modell oder Utopie, Munich 1988.
 Malte König. Franco Basaglia und das Gesetz 180. Die Auflösung der psychiatrischen Anstalten in Italien 1978, in: Petra Terhoeven (ed.). Italien, Blicke. Neue Perspektiven der italienischen Geschichte des 19. und 20. Jahrhunderts, Göttingen 2010, S. 209–233.
 Giuliano Scabia. Marco Cavallo. Da un ospedale psichiatrico la vera storia che ha cambiato il modo di essere del teatro e della cura, Alphabeta Verlag, Merano, 2011, .
 Horacio Riquelme (ed.). Die neue italienische Psychiatrie. Wandel in der klinischen Praxis und im psychosozialen Territorium, Frankfurt a.M. 1988.

Films on Franco Basaglia 

 I giardini di Abele, by Sergio Zavoli, 1968, on RaiPlay.
 C'era una volta la città dei matti... directed by Silvano Agosti, 2000, Istituto Luce.
 La seconda ombra directed by Marco Turco, producer Rai Fiction and Ciao Ragazzi!, 2010
 
 
 
 

1924 births
1980 deaths
Theorists in psychiatry
Italian psychiatrists
Italian political philosophers
Psychiatry academics
Medical anthropologists
Phenomenologists
Existential therapists
Physicians from Venice
University of Padua alumni
Academic staff of the University of Parma
Anti-psychiatry
Deaths from brain cancer in Italy
Deinstitutionalisation in Italy
Burials at Isola di San Michele
20th-century Italian physicians